The 1985 Copa del Rey Final was the 83rd final of the King's Cup. The final was played at Santiago Bernabéu Stadium in Madrid, on 30 June 1985, being won by Atlético Madrid, who beat Athletic Bilbao 2–1.

Details

See also
Same finalists:
1921 Copa del Rey Final
1956 Copa del Generalísimo Final
2012 UEFA Europa League Final

References

1985
Copa
Atlético Madrid matches
Athletic Bilbao matches